Hygrocybe umbilicata is a species of the fungal family Hygrophoraceae. This species is the first of its genus reported for Bangladesh. It was found in Singra Forest, Birganj, Dinajpur district of Bangladesh.

References

Fungi of Bangladesh
umbilicata
Fungi described in 2016